Patricia Lugo Barriga (born 8 November 1973) is a Mexican politician affiliated with the PAN. As of 2013 she served as Deputy of the LXII Legislature of the Mexican Congress representing Colima.

References

1973 births
Living people
Politicians from Colima
Women members of the Chamber of Deputies (Mexico)
National Action Party (Mexico) politicians
21st-century Mexican politicians
21st-century Mexican women politicians
University of Colima alumni
Members of the Congress of Colima
Deputies of the LXII Legislature of Mexico
Members of the Chamber of Deputies (Mexico) for Colima